The Rolling Stones' Tour of the Americas '75 was a 1975 concert tour originally intended to reach both North and South America. The plans for concerts in Central and South America never solidified, however, and the tour covered only the United States and Canada.

History
After the departure of Mick Taylor, this was the Rolling Stones' first tour with new guitarist Ronnie Wood. Announced on 14 April as merely playing with the band on the tour, it would not be until 19 December that he would be officially named a Rolling Stone. Longtime sidemen Bobby Keys and Jim Price on brass were not featured on this tour, while Billy Preston had replaced Nicky Hopkins on keyboards in 1973. Additionally, Ollie E. Brown was added as an additional percussionist. Keys made a guest appearance on "You Can't Always Get What You Want" and "Brown Sugar" at the Los Angeles shows.

The Tour of the Americas '75 was not tied to support of any newly released material, as it began more than seven months after the release of their last studio album at the time, It's Only Rock'n Roll. Instead, the compilation album Made in the Shade was released to capitalise on the tour's publicity.

The announcement of the tour became famous in itself. On 1 May, reporters were gathered inside the Fifth Avenue Hotel on 9th Street in New York City's Greenwich Village to attend a press conference where the Stones were scheduled to appear. But the Stones never went into the hotel. Improvisational comedian "Professor" Irwin Corey gave a typically long-winded, nonsensical performance for journalists waiting for the Stones. The press was still listening to Corey ramble on when they finally noticed that the Stones were playing "Brown Sugar" on a flatbed truck driving down Fifth Avenue.

The handful of curiosity seekers standing outside the hotel – who'd heard a rumor of the press conference and who were hoping to catch a glimpse of the Stones entering the hotel – were instead treated to the sight of a flatbed truck rolling down Fifth Avenue carrying the Stones, their instruments and a wall of amps. The truck stopped in front of the hotel entrance and the band played an extended version of "Brown Sugar". Charlie Watts had suggested this adaptation of a promotional gimmick often used by New Orleans jazz musicians; the idea was later emulated by groups like AC/DC and U2. After the Stones finished the song, the flatbed truck rolled down Fifth Avenue another block and the band jumped into limousines. They never attended the press conference.

The mid-1970s were the era of extravagant stage shows, from the likes of Elton John, Alice Cooper, Kiss and Queen. In keeping with this, the Stones embraced a new format for the 1975 concerts. Their act was aided by theatrical stage props and gimmicks, including a giant inflatable phallus (nicknamed 'Tired Grandfather' by the band, since it sometimes malfunctioned) and, at some shows, an unfolding lotus flower-shaped stage that Charlie Watts had conceived.

The tour officially began on 3 June 1975 at the Convention Center in San Antonio, Texas; however first the group played two warmup shows on 1 June at Louisiana State University in Baton Rouge, Louisiana. The tour continued, playing mostly arenas in the United States and Canada, including six consecutive nights at Madison Square Garden in New York and five nights at The Forum in Los Angeles. However, a planned Latin American leg in Mexico, Brazil, and Venezuela for the balance of August was cancelled due to a combination of currency fluctuations and security concerns. Four additional US dates were then added, culminating in a final performance on 8 August at Rich Stadium near Buffalo, New York.

The 1977 live album Love You Live has "Fingerprint File" and "It's Only Rock 'n Roll" from Toronto, 17 June 1975 and "Sympathy for the Devil" from Los Angeles, 9 July 1975.

In 2012, the entire show from Los Angeles, 13 July 1975 was released as part of the 'Rolling Stones Archive', mixed and remastered by Bob Clearmountain. This show was previously available in excellent audience quality on the 'LA Friday' bootleg. The title is a reference to a Rolling Stone review of the Friday, 11 July 1975 show, even though the actual featured show was from Sunday, 13 July.

Personnel

The Rolling Stones
Mick Jagger – lead vocals, harmonica, guitar on "Fingerprint File"
Keith Richards – guitars, vocals
Bill Wyman – bass guitar, synthesizer on "Fingerprint File"
Charlie Watts – drums, percussion
Ronnie Wood – guitar, vocals, bass guitar on "Fingerprint File"

Additional musicians
Billy Preston – keyboards, vocals
Ollie Brown – percussion, drums on "That's Life" (sung by Billy Preston) and "Outa-Space" (led by Billy Preston)
Ian Stewart – piano

New York, Madison Square Garden, June 22, 23, 24, 25, 26, 27:
The Steel Association - percussion on 'Sympathy for the Devil'

New York, Madison Square Garden, June 22:
Eric Clapton - guitar on 'Sympathy for the Devil'

New York, Madison Square Garden, June 27:
Carlos Santana - guitar on 'Sympathy for the Devil'

Los Angeles Forum, July 9, 10, 11, 12, 13 shows only:
Steve Madaio – trumpet
Trevor Lawrence, Bobby Keys – saxophone
The Steel Association - percussion on 'Sympathy for the Devil'

Los Angeles Forum, July 13:
Jesse Ed Davis - guitar on 'Sympathy For The Devil'

Tour set list
The most typical set list for the shows was:

Intro music: Fanfare for the Common Man
 "Honky Tonk Women"
 "All Down the Line"
 "If You Can't Rock Me"/"Get Off of My Cloud"
 "Star Star"
 "Gimme Shelter"
 "Ain't Too Proud to Beg"
 "You Gotta Move"
 "You Can't Always Get What You Want"
 "Happy"
 "Tumbling Dice"
 "It's Only Rock 'n Roll (But I Like It)" 
 "Doo Doo Doo Doo Doo (Heartbreaker)"
 "Fingerprint File"
 "Angie"
 "Wild Horses"
 "That's Life" (sung by Billy Preston)
 "Outa-Space" (led by Billy Preston)
 "Brown Sugar"
 "Midnight Rambler"
 "Rip This Joint"
 "Street Fighting Man"
 "Jumpin' Jack Flash" 
 Encore: for the New York City and Los Angeles shows "Sympathy for the Devil" was played as an encore, with Eric Clapton and Carlos Santana guesting in New York City and Jesse Ed Davis guesting in Los Angeles.

The set was longer than on previous tours, and set list variation was a bit more frequent, with several tunes making sporadic appearances: "Rocks Off", "Luxury", "Dance Little Sister", "Cherry Oh, Baby" and "Sure the One You Need". Otherwise, as with their 1972 American Tour, the band's pre-1968 catalogue was almost completely ignored except "Get Off of My Cloud", and their signature song "(I Can't Get No) Satisfaction" absent.

Tour dates

Tickets 
Tickets were sold by direct mail order by the concert venue, not a national ticket seller in 1975. For example, A ticket request and a check for $12 (US) was required for each ticket sale for the Jacksonville show sent by US Mail, and was fulfilled in about two weeks.

References

 Carr, Roy.  The Rolling Stones: An Illustrated Record.  Harmony Books, 1976.

External links
 'Rocks Off' page tour setlists
 Concert Stage Design The Rolling Stones Tour of the Americas 1975 - The Lotus Stage
 T.O.T.A '75 The official book of the Rolling Stones Tour of the Americas '75

The Rolling Stones concert tours
1975 concert tours
1975 in American music
1975 in Canadian music
Tickets